Original Sin is a 2001 erotic thriller film starring Antonio Banderas and Angelina Jolie. It is based on the novel Waltz into Darkness by Cornell Woolrich, and is a remake of the 1969 François Truffaut film Mississippi Mermaid.  The film was produced by actress Michelle Pfeiffer's production company, Via Rosa Productions.

Plot
Original Sin is set in late 19th century Cuba during the Spanish rule, and flashes back and forth from the scene of a woman awaiting her execution while telling her story to a priest to the actual events of that story.

Luis Vargas, a Cuban man, sends for American Julia Russell from Delaware to be his mail-order bride. Julia comes off the ship, looking nothing like her photos. Julia explains she wants more than a man who is only interested in a pretty face, so she substituted a plain-looking woman's photo. Luis also admits to deception; he has misled her into believing he is a poor clerk instead of a wealthy plantation owner. Julia says that they both have something in common: that both are not to be trusted. But they assure each other that they will try to understand and trust each other in life.

Luis and Julia wed in the church within hours of her setting foot in Cuba. Luis falls desperately in love with her and they have passionate sex. Meanwhile, Julia's sister Emily is worried. She sends an emotional letter asking about her welfare. Luis forces Julia to write back, fearing that if Julia continues to ignore Emily's letters, Emily will assume something terrible has befallen her sister, and she might send the authorities. Holding off as long as possible, Julia finally pens a letter to her sister.

Luis adds Julia to his business and personal bank accounts, giving her free rein to spend as she pleases. A detective, Walter Downs, arrives from Wilmington and tells Luis that he has been hired by Emily to find her sister Julia and would like to see her on the coming Sunday. Luis informs Julia about this, and she gets upset. Emily arrives in Cuba to meet Luis and shows the letter Julia wrote to her. She informs Luis that she believes Julia to be an impostor and that her sister may be dead. Luis discovers that Julia has taken nearly all of his fortune and teams up with Walter to look for her.

Luis finds Julia and discovers she is actually in league with Walter. Luis believes she loves him and lies to Walter, but when confronted, a fight breaks out, and Luis shoots Walter. Julia sends Luis to go and buy them tickets home, but it was a trick, and Walter is not dead. Julia appears to love Luis but fears Walter, so she and Luis run off to live secretly, with the supposedly dead Walter in pursuit. Walter turns out to be Julia (Bonny's) old lover and partner, Billy. Billy makes a cut on Bonny's back before having sex with her, as he did during their previous encounters.

Luis throws away his promising future to be with Julia/Bonny. One night, Luis follows Julia/Bonny and discovers Walter/Billy is alive and that the two are still working together; she is apparently going to poison her husband that very night. He returns home to wait for her, and when she arrives, he reveals that he knows about the plan, confesses his love for her once more, and swallows the poisoned drink. Julia flees with the dying Luis, with Walter close behind. They run into him at a train station; Walter is furious that Julia has betrayed him. As Walter holds a knife to her throat, Luis shoots and wounds him, with Julia finishing him off.

Back in the mise en scene, Julia finishes her story and asks the priest to pray with her. The next morning the guards come to her cell to take her to her execution, only to find the priest kneeling in her clothing.

In Morocco, Julia is watching a card game. She walks around the table occupied by gamblers - including Luis - and thanks them for allowing her to watch. As Julia signals Luis about the other players' cards, he begins telling them the story of how they got there.

Cast

Reception
On Rotten Tomatoes the film has a 12% approval rating based on 90 reviews and an average rating of 3.40/10. The site's consensus states: "Laughably melodramatic, Original Sin features bad acting, poor dialogue and even worse plotting." On Metacritic it has a score of 33 based on reviews from 24 critics, indicating generally unfavorable reviews. 

Roger Ebert of the Chicago Sun-Times gave the movie a positive review and said about Jolie's performance, "Jolie continues to stalk through pictures entirely on her own terms. Her presence is like a dare-ya for a man. There's dialogue in this movie so overwrought, it's almost literally unspeakable, and she survives it by biting it off contemptuously and spitting it out."

Angelina Jolie was nominated for a Golden Raspberry Award for Worst Actress for her work in both this film and Lara Croft: Tomb Raider.

Controversial Sex Scene
In the movie Antonio Banderas and Angelina Jolie share a very controversial sex scene that drew much attention to the movie when it was released. Most of the scene is shown from a camera above them, in which Jolie's breasts and buttocks and Banderas' buttocks are completely shown. In the scene, Banderas fondles and kisses Jolie's breasts. It is implied that Jolie's character gives oral sex to Bandera's character and Bandera's gives anal sex to Jolie though it is not fully shown in either case. During the middle of the scene Jolie's left leg is actually bent all the way up over Banderas' shoulder as they continue to have sexual intercourse and this was considered too graphic by a lot of people. At the end, there is an implied, once again not shown, orgasm for both of them. The scene is widely considered as one of the most graphic sex scenes of all time. 
The scene is considered almost softcore pornography by many viewers, to the point it is rumoured that Jolie and Banderas actually had sexual intercourse for the scene. However, Jolie said in an interview that it was a very tough scene to shoot and that it required complete trust as they were both completely naked.  The scene is so sensual that it had to be heavily cut to achieve a R-Rating.

References

External links

 
 
 

2001 films
2001 crime drama films
2001 romantic drama films
2000s erotic drama films
2000s mystery drama films
American crime drama films
American erotic drama films
American erotic romance films
American mystery drama films
American remakes of French films
American romantic drama films
2000s English-language films
Estudios Churubusco films
Erotic mystery films
Films based on American novels
Films based on romance novels
Films based on works by Cornell Woolrich
Films directed by Michael Cristofer
Films produced by Denise Di Novi
Films scored by Terence Blanchard
Films set in the 1880s
Films set in Cuba
Films with screenplays by Michael Cristofer
Hyde Park Entertainment films
Metro-Goldwyn-Mayer films
2000s American films